The 1934 Brown Bears football team represented Brown University as an independent during the 1934 college football season. Led by ninth-year head coach Tuss McLaughry, the Bears compiled a record of 3–6.

Schedule

References

Brown
Brown Bears football seasons
Brown Bears football